Hoggarth is a surname. Notable people with the surname include:

Ann Hoggarth (born  1950), Canadian politician
Francis Hoggarth (1876–1961), Scottish cricketer
Ron Hoggarth (born 1948), Canadian ice hockey official

See also
Hogarth (disambiguation)